CJNI-FM (95.7 MHz) is a Canadian radio station in Halifax, Nova Scotia. CJNI has a News/Talk/Sports format branded as CityNews 95.7. The station is owned by Rogers Sports & Media which also owns sister station CFLT-FM. CJNI-FM is currently the only commercial News/Talk/Sports station in Atlantic Canada. Studios and offices are on Young Street in Halifax, while the transmitter is located on Washmill Lake Drive in Clayton Park.

Programming
On weekdays, CJNI has an all-news block during morning drive times. Middays and afternoons, two talk shows are heard, hosted by Todd Veinotte and Jeff Marek. Overnight and early weekend mornings, CJNI carries the national Rogers all-news service, shared with CFTR Toronto, CKWX Vancouver and CIWW Ottawa.

"An Hour To Give" with Sam Laprade and "The Big Story" podcast run on the weekend mornings, along with "The Weekend Gardener" with Niki Jabbour during the noon hours.

In the evening and weekend afternoons, CJNI carries CBS Sports Radio. The station features play-by-play from three teams: Toronto Blue Jays, Montreal Canadiens, and the Halifax Mooseheads in the QMJHL.

History
On November 26, 2004, Rogers Communications received approval from the Canadian Radio-television and Telecommunications Commission (CRTC) for a new English-language News/Talk commercial FM radio station in Halifax to operate at 95.7 MHz. The station officially signed on the air on October 11, 2005, at 5:30a.m.

The station was networked with CKNI-FM in Moncton, and CHNI-FM in Saint John, until August 2014, when those two stations were sold to separate owners and flipped to music formats.

In June 2021, Rogers announced that it would rebrand CJNI and its other all-news and news/talk radio stations under the CityNews brand beginning October 18, 2021.  This was despite the fact that Citytv does not operate in the region, only being available in Atlantic Canada on cable and satellite as an out-of-market distant signal.

Former Logos

References

External links
CityNews 95.7

Jni
Jni
Jni
Radio stations established in 2005
2005 establishments in Nova Scotia